Paul Zingtung Grawng (20 March 1935 – 24 October 2020) was a Myanmar Roman Catholic archbishop.

Zingtung Grawng was born in Myanmar and was ordained to the priesthood in 1965. He served as titular bishop of 'Rusguniea' and as auxiliary bishop and bishop of the Roman Catholic Diocese of Myitkyina, Myanmar, from 1976 to 2003 and as archbishop of the Roman Catholic Archdiocese of Mandalay Myanmar, from 2003 to 2014.

Notes

1935 births
2020 deaths
21st-century Roman Catholic bishops in Myanmar
Burmese Roman Catholic archbishops